Vilnius University Hospital Santaros Klinikos (formerly known as Santariškių Klinikos ) in Vilnius, Lithuania is a teaching hospital of the Vilnius University Faculty of Medicine. Santaros Klinikos is co-funded by the Lithuanian Ministry of Health and Vilnius University. It has a staff of 5372 employees, including 1409 medical doctors, 1978 nurses and other highly qualified professionals. More than 370 professors and doctorates and 4 academics are providing assistance to the patients.

History 
The Vilnius University Hospital Santaros Klinikos was founded as the Republican Vilnius Clinical Hospital in November, 1980, when the block of therapy and divisions of diagnostics started working. In 1982, the first patients were admitted to the Consultative Out-patient Department, whereas the block of surgery was opened in 1983.

Centers and departments 

The hospital has these centres:
 Centre of Neurology
 Centre of Medical Genetics 
 Centre of Abdominal surgery 
 Centre of Anaesthesiology, Intensive therapy and Pain Management 
 Centre of Family Medicine
 Centre of Hepatology, Gastroenterology and Dietetics
 Centre of Laboratory medicine 
 Centre of Nephrology 
 Centre of Pulmonary Hypertension Referral
 Centre of Pulmonology and Allergology 
 Centre of Rheumatology 
 Department of Clinical Pharmacology
 Nursing Study Centre 
 Radiology and Nuclear Medicine Centre
 Urology Centre
 Centre of Informatics and Development

External links

References 

Hospital buildings completed in 1980
Hospital buildings completed in 1983
Hospitals in Lithuania
Teaching hospitals
Buildings and structures of Vilnius University
Hospitals in Vilnius